Edward Harley may refer to:

Edward Harley (Parliamentarian) (1624–1700) of Brampton Bryan, Herefordshire
Edward Harley (1664–1735), MP for Droitwich 1695–1698 and later for Leominster
Edward Harley, 2nd Earl of Oxford and Earl Mortimer (1689–1741), son of Robert Harley, 1st Earl of Oxford and Earl Mortimer
Edward Harley, 3rd Earl of Oxford and Earl Mortimer (1699–1755)
Edward Harley, 4th Earl of Oxford and Earl Mortimer (1726–1790)
Edward Harley, 5th Earl of Oxford and Earl Mortimer (1773–1849)
Edward Harley (cricketer) (1839-1901), English cricketer